Tinamotis   is a genus of birds in the tinamou family.

Taxonomy
All tinamou are from the family Tinamidae, and in the larger scheme are also ratites.  Unlike other ratites, tinamous can fly, although in general, they are not strong fliers.  All ratites evolved from prehistoric flying birds, and tinamous are the closest living relative of these birds.

Species
The species are:

Footnotes

References
 
 
 
 ITIS

 
Bird genera